Kamran-e Rahman (also Romanized as Kāmrān-e Raḥmān) is a village in Qalkhani Rural District, Gahvareh District, Dalahu County, Kermanshah Province, Iran. At the 2006 census, its population was 121, in 24 families.

References 

Populated places in Dalahu County